Yermolovka may refer to:

Yermolovka, Voronezh Oblast
Yermolovka, Republic of Tatarstan, a village in the Republic of Tatarstan, Russia
Yermolovka, name of several other rural localities in Russia